This is a list of museums in Saint Kitts and Nevis.

 National Museum of Saint Kitts in Saint George Basseterre
 Nevis Historical and Conservation Society museums:
 Alexander Hamilton Museum
 Museum of Nevis History in Saint Paul Charlestown
 Joan Robinson Biodiversity and Oral History Resource Centre

See also

 Saint Kitts and Nevis

Saint Kitts and Nevis
Saint Kitts and Nevis

Museums
Museums